Anne Dickins,  (born 20 February 1967) is a British paracanoeist who competes in the KL3 classification. She won gold in this event at the 2016 Summer Paralympics, and has also won two World Championship and three European Championship golds.

Background 
Dickins was born in Glasgow, Scotland and lives in Oxted, Surrey. She is a physiotherapist by profession. She competed as an endurance mountain biker until she ruptured a disc in her back in 2011, which led to her developing cauda equina syndrome resulting in permanent nerve damage in her right leg.

Dickins was a volunteer Games Maker at the 2012 Summer Olympics in London, where she met Colin Radmore, a canoeing coach who invited her to try out for the Great Britain paracanoeing team. She had to overcome seasickness when she took up the sport, and underwent a desensitisation programme similar to those used by fighter pilots.

Career 
In her first year of competition, Dickins won gold at the 2013 European Championships and silver at the World Championships in the K-1 200m LTA class. In 2014 she successfully defended her European Championship title and won her first World Championship gold. In 2015 she won a third successive European Championship title and won the silver medal in the World Championships, competing in the K-1 200m KL3 class. At the 2016 World Championships she won gold in the K-1 200m KL3 class.

Dickins won gold in the KL3 class at the 2016 Summer Paralympics in Rio de Janeiro, the first Paralympics to feature canoeing events, beating Amanda Reynolds by a margin of 0.03 seconds.

Dickins was appointed Member of the Order of the British Empire (MBE) in the 2017 New Year Honours for services to canoeing.

Notes

References

External links
 

1967 births
Living people
Paracanoeists of Great Britain
Paracanoeists at the 2016 Summer Paralympics
Paralympic gold medalists for Great Britain
Medalists at the 2016 Summer Paralympics
Sportspeople from Glasgow
People from Oxted
British physiotherapists
Members of the Order of the British Empire
ICF Canoe Sprint World Championships medalists in paracanoe
Paralympic medalists in paracanoe